Major General Granville George Algernon Egerton (10 May 1859 – 3 May 1951) commanded the 52nd Lowland Infantry Division during the First World War, from March 1914 to September 1915. His wartime service included a command during the Gallipoli Campaign.

Early life
Egerton was born at 35 Hertford Street in Mayfair, London, to Col. Hon. Arthur Frederick Egerton of the Grenadier Guards and his wife Helen (née Smith), daughter of Martin Tucker Smith of the Smith banking family. His grandfather was the 1st Earl of Ellesmere.

Attending Charterhouse School, he was a member of the house Saunderites between 1872 and 1879. After completing his studies at the Royal Military Academy Sandhurst, he was commissioned as a second lieutenant. The commission was dated 13 August 1879.

Military service 
Serving with the 72nd Regiment of Foot, Egerton participated in the march from Kabul to Kandahar during the Second Afghan War. The British force defeated an Afghan army under Ayub Khan at the Battle of Kandahar, a battle in which Edgerton received severe wounds. For his service in Afghanistan he was mentioned in dispatches. Of the Kabul to Kandahar march Egerton wrote in 1930,

His service continued with the Anglo-Egyptian War of 1882 and the Nile Expedition to Sudan in 1898, where he was mentioned in dispatches twice more. He is recorded in 1893 as being in service as a captain in the Seaforth Highlanders and was Scottish District Inspector of Musketry. In this capacity Edgerton was responsible for the training of regular, militia and volunteer soldiers in Scotland. When an army camp was established at Barry in Angus the rifle ranges were constructed "in accordance with his ideas and under his supervision".

Egerton became commander of the 1st Infantry Brigade in September 1909 and then General Officer Commanding the 52nd Lowland Infantry Division in March 1914 during the First World War. His division took part in the landing at Cape Helles in June 1915 and Egerton received a further two mentions in dispatches during the First World War. On 30 August 1915 Egerton noted,

Egerton went on to be director of infantry at the War Office in April 1916 and then retired with the rank of major general in 1919.

Later life
After the war he was colonel of the Highland Light Infantry between 1921 and 1929. In a letter to The Times in 1927 he wrote of his service in the early days of the First World War,

He died at 7 Inverleith Place, Edinburgh, on 3 May 1951 with his funeral taking place at Warriston Crematorium.

References

External links
 Granville George Algernon Egerton portrait in 1880 at the BBC
 Granville George Algernon Egerton papers at the Imperial War Museum

1859 births
1951 deaths
British Army generals of World War I
British military personnel of the Second Anglo-Afghan War
British Army personnel of the Anglo-Egyptian War
British Army major generals
Graduates of the Royal Military College, Sandhurst
Seaforth Highlanders officers
Military personnel from London
People educated at Charterhouse School